William Rice (by 1522 – 1588), of Medmenham, Buckinghamshire, was an English politician.

Family
William Rice was the son of Mr. Rice and his wife Eden née Saunders, daughter of Thomas Saunders. He married Barbara ?Fuller.

Career
He was a Member (MP) of the Parliament of England for Aylesbury in November 1554 and 1555, and for Lancaster in 1558.

References

1588 deaths
People from Buckinghamshire
English MPs 1554–1555
English MPs 1558
Year of birth uncertain